The Wychavon Way is a waymarked long-distance footpath in Worcestershire, England, maintained by a partnership between Wychavon District Council and Worcestershire County Council.

Distance

The route

The route was originally opened in 1977 to commemorate the Silver Jubilee of Elizabeth II. It started from Holt Fleet on the Worcestershire stretch of the River Severn finished at Winchcombe to link with the Cotswold Way.

In Spring 2012 a new revised route was unveiled. The new route starts at Droitwich Spa and mostly follows the original route to just before Fladbury. It then deviates to include Pershore and the summit of Bredon Hill, before continuing west to finish at Broadway. The new route remains entirely within the District of Wychavon. 

The original waymarks comprised a yellow three pointed crow. New waymarks have been put up to sign the new route. These contain a logo with a trebuchet on a green hill above a horizontally stretched V-shaped blue river.

References

External links
Wychavon Way info from the Rambler's Association
Wychavon Way from Worcestershire County Council

Long-distance footpaths in England
Wychavon
Buildings and structures completed in 1977
Footpaths in Worcestershire